"Pipa xing", variously translated as "Song of the Pipa" or "Ballad of the Lute", is a Tang Dynasty poem composed in 816 by the Chinese poet Bai Juyi, one of the greatest poets in Chinese history. The poem contains a description of a pipa performance during a chance encounter with a performer near the Yangtze River.

Background and description 
During the reign of Emperor Xianzong, Bai Juyi was exiled from court and appointed the sima in the distant town of Xun Yang. Traveling up the Yangtze River, he encountered a singer and pipa player who had also once lived in Chang'an. She was forced to leave the capital when her beauty and fame faded and married a merchant, but she had lost none of her skill, and she played for him. "Pipa xing" ("Pipa Song") describes the encounter and her performance. 

The poem has a total of 616 characters (not including the 138-character preface), and is known for the skilled artistry with which it describes sound. A well-known line of the poem is "Both of us, fallen from grace, wandering at the edge of the world, need not be old acquaintances to meet by chance." Ming dynasty calligrapher Chen Hongshou called the poem "very emotional and very expressive," adding that it made its hearers long for death in sympathy with its characters.

Poem
The poem includes a preface, describing how Bai came to write the poem.

The poem include a description of performance:
{|
!width=12%|
!width=45%|
|-
|
大絃嘈嘈如急雨
小絃切切如私語
嘈嘈切切錯雜彈
大珠小珠落玉盤
|
Thick strings clatter like splattering rain, 
Fine strings murmur like whispered words, 
Clattering and murmuring, meshing interweaving sounds,
Like pearls, big and small, falling on a platter of jade.
|}

Impact on Chinese culture 

The poem has inspired a number of paintings on the meeting between the poet and the pipa player, an example is the painting by Guo Xu (pictured right).
The quickly plucked notes of the pipa are compared to the sound of large and small pearls falling onto a jade plate. The Oriental Pearl Tower, the most famous sight of the city of Shanghai, bases its architecture, view and name on the poem. Eleven spheres of varying sizes are built into its structure, so that, viewed from the Bund, the building evokes the image of pearls, large and small, falling from heaven onto a jade plate represented by the surface of the Huangpu River, recalling the music of the pipa.

References

External links

Tang dynasty poetry
Chinese poems